Class 155 may refer to:

British Rail Class 155
DR Class 250, known as the Class 155 since 1992